The Youth Forum of the Democratic Party of Albania (abbreviated as FRPD) is the youth wing of the Democratic Party of Albania. Founded in 1990 following the collapse of the communist regime, FRPD in recent times has grown to become one of the largest youth political organisations in the western balkans, with major contributions and influence within the Democratic Party. FRPD is one of the founders of the Youth of European People's Party (YEPP) in 1997, and in 2020, following years of negotiations, managed to become full members of European Democrat Students. 

In October 2022, Besart Xhaferri was elected chairman of FRPD.

Chairs of FRPD

External links 
 Youth forum of the Democratic Party of Albania

References

Democratic Party of Albania
Youth wings of conservative parties
Youth wings of political parties in Albania